Thomas Anthony Anderson (born May 8, 1933) is an American politician and a Republican former member of the New Mexico House of Representatives representing District 29 from January 2003 through January 2015.

Elections

Elections for the office of New Mexico House of Representatives took place in 2014. A primary election took place on June 3, 2014, and a general election took place on November 4, 2014. The signature-filing deadline for candidates wishing to run in this election was February 4, 2014. Incumbent Thomas Anderson was defeated by David Edward Adkins in the Republican primary, while Ronnie Martinez was unopposed in the Democratic primary.
 2012 Anderson was challenged in the June 5, 2012 Republican Primary, winning with 679 votes (57.5%) and won the November 6, 2012 General election with 6,026 votes (52.5%) against Democratic nominee Lloyd Ginsberg.
 2002 When District 29 incumbent Republican Representative William Fuller left the Legislature and left the seat open, Anderson ran in the 2002 Republican Primary, winning with 892 votes (51.3%) and won the November 5, 2002 General election with 4,697 votes (60.1%) against Democratic nominee Joann Anders.
 2004 Anderson and returning 2002 Democratic opponent Joann Anders were both unopposed for their June 1, 2004 primaries, setting up a rematch; Anderson won the November 2, 2004 General election with 9,027 votes (55.4%) against Anders.
 2006 Anderson was challenged in the June 6, 2006 Republican Primary and won with 620 votes (64%), in the November 7, 2006 General election, Anderson won with 6,929 votes (52.8%) against Democratic nominee Antonio Sandoval.
 2008 Anderson was unopposed for both the June 8, 2008 Republican Primary, winning with 2,598 votes and the November 4, 2008 General election with 14,871 votes.
 2010 Anderson was unopposed for the June 1, 2010 Republican Primary, winning with 2,844 votes and won the November 2, 2010 General election with 9,274 votes (59.1%) against Democratic nominee Alexander Russell.

References

External links
 Official page at the New Mexico Legislature
 
 Thomas Anderson at Ballotpedia
 Thomas Anthony Anderson at the National Institute on Money in State Politics

Place of birth missing (living people)
1933 births
Living people
Republican Party members of the New Mexico House of Representatives
Politicians from Albuquerque, New Mexico
United States Navy officers